Un égale trois (or 1= 3) is a French comedy television show created by Jacques Martin and Jean Yanne and was broadcast  on RTF from January to June 1964.

Controversy

A controversial sketch was broadcast on March 1964 where Jean Yanne and Jacques Martin did a skit involving the Battle of Waterloo in the form of a bicycle race.

References

1964 French television series debuts
1964 French television series endings
1960s French television series
1960s satirical television series
French-language television shows